Fair Phyllis (also Fair Phyllis I saw, Fair Phyllis I saw sitting all alone) is an English madrigal by John Farmer. The music is polyphonic and was published in 1599. The madrigal contains four voices and uses occasional imitation. It also alternates between triple and duple beat subdivisions of the beat in different parts of the work.

This is an English madrigal. Farmer uses clever word painting. For example, in the opening line "Fair Phyllis I saw sitting all alone", Farmer had only the soprano sing since she was all alone. In the next line "Feeding her flock near to the mountain side", all the voices sang since it was her flock. Additionally, the second phase, which begins with "Up and down he wandered" and ends with "then they fell a-kissing" repeats, causing the elision "kissing up and down."

The madrigal featured in the episode Death in Chorus of the British detective drama Midsomer Murders.

Story
The song describes a person who saw a young shepherdess sitting alone feeding her sheep near a mountain.  The other shepherds did not know where she was at the time. Her lover, Amyntas, goes looking for her and wanders through the hills. Eventually, he finds her, and when he does, they fall down and start kissing. The lyrics have a humorous ribald twist with the words "up and down he wandered". The first time it refers to the hide-and-seek game. The second time it refers to the kissing. "oh then they fell a kissing, up and down he wandered".

Lyrics
Fair Phyllis I saw sitting all alone
Feeding her flock near to the mountainside.
The shepherds knew not,
They knew not whither she was gone,
But after her lover, Amyntas hied,
Up and down he wandered
whilst she was missing;
When he found her,
O then they fell a-kissing.

note: 'hied' is a form of the archaic verb 'hie' which means 'to hasten or hurry';
see The Oxford Book of English Madrigals for text and full score.

External links
 

English madrigals